Anacantha is a group of thistles in the daisy family, first described as a genus in 1956 with the name Modestia. This was later to be regarded as an illegitimate homonym, and so in 1982 the name was changed to Anacantha.

The entire genus is native to Uzbekistan.

 Species
 Anacantha darwasica (C.Winkl.) Soják - Uzbekistan
 Anacantha jucunda (C.Winkl.) Soják - Uzbekistan
 Anacantha mira (Iljin) Soják - Uzbekistan

References

Asteraceae genera
Flora of Uzbekistan
Cynareae